The 2007–08 Ekstraklasa started in July 2007 and ended in mid-May 2008. It was run by the Ekstraklasa SA.

The Polish Champion will qualify for the UEFA Champions League second qualifying round. The runner-up and winner of the Polish Cup will qualify for the UEFA Cup first qualifying round. The third placed team will qualify for the second round of the UEFA Intertoto Cup. The bottom two teams will be relegated to Poland League Two for 2008-09 season, with the 3rd bottom team playing off against the 4th-placed team in Poland League Two to decide the final positions for next season (the winner will be either promoted or stay in the top league).

Clubs 

The following teams played in the Ekstraklasa:
 Cracovia
 GKS Bełchatów
 Górnik Zabrze
 Dyskobolia Grodzisk Wielkopolski (2007 Polish Cup winner)
 Korona Kielce
 Lech Poznań
 Legia Warsaw
 ŁKS Łódź
 Odra Wodzisław
 Widzew Łódź
 Wisła Kraków
 Zagłębie Lubin (2007 Polish Champion)
 Ruch Chorzów (promoted from Polish Second League)
 Jagiellonia Białystok (promoted from Polish Second League)
 Polonia Bytom (promoted from Polish Second League)
 Zagłębie Sosnowiec (promoted from Polish Second League)

Relegated teams 
 Zagłębie Lubin
 Korona Kielce
 Widzew Łódź
 Zagłębie Sosnowiec

League table

Results

Top goalscorers

Awards

Piłka Nożna Magazines Awards

Piłka Nożna's All-Star team of fall 2007/08 

Runners Up:

References

See also 
 Liga Site

Ekstraklasa seasons
Poland
1